The Girl from Hong Kong (German: Das Mädchen von Hongkong, UK theatrical title: Circle of Fear) is a 1973 West German action film directed by Jürgen Roland and starring Joachim Fuchsberger, Li Paelz and Véronique Vendell.

The film's sets were designed by the art director Peter Rothe.

Cast
 Joachim Fuchsberger  as Frank Boyd 
 Li Paelz  as Mai Li 
 Véronique Vendell  as Meredith Harris 
 Eva Garden  as Catherine Harris 
 Arthur Brauss  as Delgado 
 Grégoire Aslan  as Harris 
 Pierre Vernier as Richmond 
 Ann Peng  as Irma 
 Jimmy Shaw  as Edward Collins

References

Bibliography 
 Bock, Hans-Michael & Bergfelder, Tim. The Concise Cinegraph: Encyclopaedia of German Cinema. Berghahn Books, 2009.

External links 
 

1973 films
1970s crime action films
German crime action films
West German films
1970s German-language films
Films directed by Jürgen Roland
Constantin Film films
Films set in Hong Kong
Films shot in Hong Kong
1970s German films